Urso of Calabria, also Urso of Salerno, Ursus Salernitanus, Urso di Calabria (died 1225) was an Italian scholastic philosopher and significant author of medical works in the school of Salerno. He has been thought the leading figure of the school and its most important theoretician and Aristotelian. He had a European reputation.

Works
Anatomia
Compendium de urinis
De commixtionibus elementorum
Glossulae
De effectibus medicinarum
De effectibus qualitatum
De criticis diebus
De pulsibus
De saporibus et numero eorundem
Aphorismi

References
 Wolfgang Stürner, Urso von Salerno, De commixtionibus elementorum libellus (1976)

Notes

1225 deaths
Italian male writers
Scholastic philosophers
Year of birth unknown
13th-century Latin writers
13th-century Italian writers
13th-century Italian physicians
13th-century philosophers